The 32nd Meijin is the 32nd iteration of the Meijin go tournament. The name Meijin refers to the traditional title given to the superior play during the Edo period.

Preliminaries

Group A

Group B

Group C

Main tournament

Group stage

Key:
Green - Winner of group; challenges for title or earns a spot in the challenger final
Blue - Earns a place in the next edition's group stage.
Red - Eliminated from automatic berth; must qualify through preliminary stages.

Finals

Key
W+ - Won by
R - Resignation

References 

2007 in go
Go competitions in Japan